Year 1128 (MCXXVIII) was a leap year starting on Sunday (link will display the full calendar) of the Julian calendar.

Events 
 By place 

 Byzantine Empire 
 Byzantine–Hungarian War: Emperor John II (Komnenos) defeats the Hungarians and their Serbian allies at the fortress of Haram (or Chramon), which is modern-day Nova Palanka. 

 Europe 
 June 24 – Battle of São Mamede: Count Alfonso I (Henriques) defeats the forces led by his mother, Queen Theresa of Portugal, near Guimarães, and gains control of the county. Alfonso styles himself "Prince of Portugal".
 June 29 – Conrad III, anti-king of Germany, is crowned "King of Italy" by Archbishop Anselmo della Pusterla at Monza in Lombardy.
 July 27 – The city of Bruges (modern Belgium) is founded. It receives its city charter – as well new walls and canals are built.
 Pope Honorius II invests Roger II of Sicily as duke of Apulia at Benevento, after his failure to form an coalition against Roger.
 King Louis VI (the Fat) of France agrees to the accession of Thierry of Alsace (or Theoderic), as count of Flanders. 

 England 
 June 17 – King Henry I marries his only legitimate daughter, dowager Empress Matilda, to the 14-year-old Geoffrey V (the Fair), count of Anjou.

 Britain 
 Hugues de Payens, French Grand Master of the Order of the Knights Templar, visits both England and Scotland, where he raises men and money for the Order.

 Asia 
 Jin–Song War: Emperor Gao Zong of the Song Dynasty establishes a new capital at Yangzhou, while the government retreats south, after Jurchen forces capture the previous capital of Kaifeng, in the Jingkang Incident.
 Forces of the Kingdom of Champa invade Vietnam.

 By topic 

 Religion 
 November 24 – Waverley Abbey is founded by Bishop William Giffard. The first abbot and 12 Cistercian monks are brought from L'Aumône Abbey in Normandy.
 Honorius II recognizes and confirms the Order of the Knights Templar. The French abbot Bernard of Clairvaux codifies the rule of the Order.
 Holyrood Abbey is founded in Edinburgh by King David I of Scotland.
 Kelso Abbey is founded by Scottish monks of the Tironensian Order.

Births 
 March 18 – Stephen of Tournai, French bishop (d. 1203)
 Absalon, Danish archbishop and statesman (d. 1201)
 Adolf II, count of Schauenburg and Holstein (d. 1164)
 Alain de Lille, French theologian and poet (approximate date)
 Ali ibn Muhammad ibn al-Walid, Arab theologian (d. 1215)
 Constance of Hauteville, princess of Antioch (d. 1163)
 John Doukas (Komnenos), Byzantine governor (d. 1176)
 John Kontostephanos, Byzantine aristocrat (approximate date)
 Lorcán Ua Tuathail, Irish archbishop of Dublin (d. 1180)
 Ludwig II (the Iron), landgrave of Thuringia (d. 1172)
 Muhammad II ibn Mahmud, Seljuk sultan (d. 1159)
 Ruzbihan Baqli, Persian poet and mystic (d. 1209)
 Taira no Norimori, Japanese nobleman (d. 1185)

Deaths 
 January 1 – Albero I, prince-bishop of Liège (b. 1070)
 February 12 – Toghtekin, Turkish ruler of Damascus
 June 2 – Pier Leoni (or Petrus Leo), Roman consul
 July 28 – William Clito, count of Flanders (b. 1102)
 September 5 – Ranulf Flambard, bishop of Durham
 December 4 – Henry II, German nobleman (b. 1102)
 December 15 – Fulco I d'Este, Lombard nobleman
 Abu Ibrahim ibn Barun, Andalusian Jewish rabbi
 Conaing Ua Beigléighinn, Irish monk and abbot
 Constantine I of Torres, ruler (judge) of Logudoro
 Fujiwara no Kiyohira, Japanese nobleman (b. 1056)
 Geoffrey Brito (or le Breton), archbishop of Rouen
 Ibn Tumart, Almoravid political leader (or 1130)
 Jimena Muñoz (or Muñiz), Spanish noblewoman
 Rogvolod Vseslavich (Boris), prince of Polotsk
 Warmund (or Gormond), patriarch of Jerusalem

References 

 

da:1120'erne#1128